The European Film Award for Best Actor is an award given out at the annual European Film Awards to recognize an actor who has delivered an outstanding leading performance in a film industry. The awards are presented by the European Film Academy (EFA) and was first presented in 1988 to Swedish actor Max von Sydow for his role as Lassefar "Lasse" Karlsson in Pelle the Conqueror.

Daniel Auteuil and Toni Servillo are the only actors who have received this award more than once with two wins each, while Mads Mikkelsen is the most nominated actor in the category with four nominations.

Winners and nominees

1980s

1990s

2000s

2010s

2020s

Multiple wins and nominations

Multiple wins

Most nominations

See also
 BAFTA Award for Best Actor in a Leading Role
 BIFA Award for Best Performance by an Actor in a British Independent Film
 César Award for Best Actor
 David di Donatello for Best Actor
 Goya Award for Best Actor
 Polish Academy Award for Best Actor
 Robert Award for Best Actor in a Leading Role

References

External links
European Film Academy archive

Actor
 
Film awards for lead actor
Awards established in 1988
1988 establishments in Europe